Łukasz Kubot and Marcelo Melo were the defending champions, but lost to  Juan Sebastián Cabal and Robert Farah in the quarterfinals.

Nikola Mektić and Alexander Peya won the title when Bob and Mike Bryan retired in the final after Bob Bryan retired due to hip injury. The Bryan brothers would have regained the ATP no. 1 doubles ranking from Kubot and Melo if they had won the title.

Seeds
All seeds received a bye into the second round.

Draw

Finals

Top half

Bottom half

References

External links
 Main Draw

Men's Doubles